Cameron Eric Brewer (born 8 March 1973) is a New Zealand former politician who was an elected representative on Auckland Council for nine years – a two-term Auckland Councillor for Ōrākei Ward, and one term as an elected member of the Rodney Local Board as part of the Rodney First ticket – before retiring at the 2019 local body elections to focus on his business.

Early years
Born in Hāwera on 8 March 1973, Brewer attended Wanganui Collegiate School (1986 to 1990) and Massey University (1991 to 1994) where he graduated with a Bachelor of Arts Double Major: History & Sociology. During 1995 he was a vocal tertiary student leader after being elected Student President at the Western Institute of Technology where he studied Print Journalism and edited the student publication. In early 1996 he founded and edited Dunedin-based community newspaper Inside Otago before selling it in late 1998. He was then employed by Parliamentary Services in Wellington, as a Writer in the National Party's Research Unit and as a Press Secretary to the Leader of the Opposition. From 2002 to 2004 Brewer was Communications Adviser to the Mayor of Auckland City.

Between 2005 and 2010 he was the chief executive of the Newmarket Business Association.

Political career

A former journalist, Brewer is a member of the New Zealand National Party and worked as press secretary to Jenny Shipley, John Banks and Rodney Hide.

In the 2010 Auckland Council elections Brewer was elected from the Ōrākei ward while standing as an Independent, winning by over 7,000 votes – winning 18,235 votes or 55%. He ran against Citizens & Ratepayers deputy leader Doug Armstrong. As a Councillor, Brewer was appointed Chairman of Auckland Council's inaugural Business Advisory Forum, Chairman of the Planning & Urban Design Panel, and Deputy Chair of the Economic Development Forum. His decision to contest the election as a right wing independent, was labelled as a betrayal by C&R members while the result was considered a humiliation for C&R in its "traditional heartland".

In 2011 he decided not to contest the safe-National Party seat of Tāmaki, following the resignation of Allan Peachey, and also ruled out standing for the ACT Party. In the past he has been considered as a potential candidate for the Mayor of Auckland in 2013.

He was re-elected unopposed to Council in 2013. He did not contest the seat in 2016, instead stood for a seat on the Rodney Local Board.

In October 2016 Brewer was elected on the Rodney First ticket which gained a majority of five members on the nine-person Rodney Local Board. He stood in the Kumeu subdivision, gaining 4,018 votes – polling the second highest of all the candidates standing for the Rodney Local Board. Brewer was Chairman of the Rodney Local Board's Transport, Infrastructure & Environment Committee from 2016 to 2019.

Brewer has been a member of the National Party since 1996 and since 2015 has resided in the  electorate. Following the announcement of John Key's pending resignation as a member of parliament, it was speculated that he was considering standing in the electorate, but he ruled it out in early January 2017 citing family, business and local board commitments.

He left politics in 2019 and runs his own communications firm, Cameron Brewer Communications Limited, established in 2015.

References

1973 births
Living people
Auckland Councillors
New Zealand National Party politicians
New Zealand journalists
People from Hāwera
People educated at Whanganui Collegiate School
Massey University alumni